Charles Eaton may refer to:

People
 Charles Eaton (actor) (1910–2004), American actor
 Charles Eaton (British actor) (active 1930s), British actor
 Charles Aubrey Eaton (1868–1953), American politician
 Charles Edward Eaton (1916–2006), American poet
 Charles Frederick Eaton (1842–1930), American artist and landscape designer
 Charles le Gai Eaton (1921–2010), Swiss-British thinker on Islam
 Charles Ormston Eaton (1827–1907), English banker, landowner and cricketer
 Charles Warren Eaton (1857–1937), American artist
 Charles Eaton (RAAF officer) (1895–1979), Australian air force aviator

Other uses
Charles Eaton (1833 ship), a barque which got wrecked in the Torres Strait in 1834